

Events
 447: November 6 – An earthquake levels large parts of the Theodosian Wall of Constantinople. Repairs, under the direction of urban prefect Cyrus of Floros, are effected within 60 days.

Buildings and structures

Buildings

 408 – 413 The Theodosian Wall, is built, as a fortification of Constantinople, running from the Sea of Marmara on the south, to the suburb of Blachernae, near the Golden Horn, on the north.
 420s – San Giovanni Evangelista, Ravenna built.
 422–432 – Santa Sabina all'Aventino Basilica in Rome built.
 427 – Anak Palace of Goguryeo built.
 430s – Baptistry of San Giovanni in Laterano, Rome reconstructed.
 430s – Santa Maria Maggiore, Rome reconstructed.
 By c. 450 – Baptistry of Neon completed.
 c. 450–470 – Church of the Acheiropoietos in Thessaloniki (Macedonia) built.
 460s – Christian basilica at Qalb Loze in Syria (Byzantine Empire) built.
 462 – Monastery of Stoudios in Constantinople established.
 475 – Church of Saint Simeon Stylites in Syria (Byzantine Empire) dedicated.
 478–493 – Bolnisi Sioni basilica in Georgia built.
 c. 480 – Deir Turmanin monastery in Syria (Byzantine Empire) built.
 483–484 – Etchmiadzin Cathedral in Armenia built.
 490 – Arian Baptistry, Ravenna begun.
 490s – Original basilica of the Abbey of Saint-Germain d'Auxerre in Burgundy built.

Births
 474 – Anthemius of Tralles, architect and mathematician (d. 534)

Deaths

See also
4th century in architecture
6th century in architecture
Timeline of architecture

References

Architecture